is the second studio album by Japanese rock band High and Mighty Color. The album was released on April 5, 2006 through Sony Music Entertainment Japan, less than seven months after their debut G∞ver.

Overview
The album was announced after only two singles having been released for it, half of what was released for their original album G∞ver. This album focused more on rock music and less on pop, which their first album focused heavily on. Unlike their first album, almost all titles for the various songs are written in Japanese as opposed to English used in the band's first album.

Track listing

Personnel
 Mākii – vocals
 Yuusuke – vocals
 Meg – guitars
 Kazuto – guitars
 Sassy – drums
 Mackaz – bass

Charts
Album - Oricon Sales Chart (Japan)

Singles - Oricon Sales Chart (Japan)

References

High and Mighty Color albums
2006 albums